Matthew "Meffy" Koloamatangi (born June 24, 1995) is an American gridiron football defensive end for the Vegas Knight Hawks of the Indoor Football League (IFL). He played college football at Hawaii.

College career 
Koloamatangi was a member of the football team at Hawaii from 2013 to 2017. While at Hawaii, he was named an honorable mention All-Mountain West twice and compiled 80 tackles and 7 sacks over three years of playing time. He was also shown to have an impact on special teams blocking kicks, including two in a game against Western Carolina.

Professional career 
After going undrafted in 2018, Koloamatangi received an invitation to participate in the Oakland Raiders rookie camp but was not signed. He was added to the San Diego Fleet roster of the Alliance of American Football in 2019, compiling 7.5 tackles and 0.5 sacks before the league folded operations later that year.

Koloamatangi was added to the roster of the BC Lions on May 18, 2019. He was released from the roster on July 17, 2019. He was later added to the practice squad of the Winnipeg Blue Bombers on September 24, 2019 and was on it when they won the 107th Grey Cup.

On March 7, 2022, Koloamatangi signed with the Vegas Knight Hawks of the Indoor Football League (IFL).

Personal life 
Koloamatangi's brother Leo also played at Hawaii and was a member of the New York Jets.

References

External links 
 Winnipeg Blue Bombers bio
 Hawaii Rainbow Warriors bio

1995 births
Living people
People from East Palo Alto, California
Players of American football from California
American football defensive ends
Hawaii Rainbow Warriors football players
San Diego Fleet players
Sportspeople from the San Francisco Bay Area
BC Lions players
Winnipeg Blue Bombers players